Adrian Lillebekk Ovlien (3 August 1997 – 16 March 2018) was a Norwegian footballer who played as a central defender for Kongsvinger. He played more than 100 competitive first-team matches for Kongsvinger, including the 2016 Norwegian Cup Final. He was also capped a total of 50 times by Norway on various youth levels from U15 to U19.

Club career

Lillebekk Ovlien grew up in Eidskog, and made his senior debut for local third division side Eidskog Fotball in 2012 as a 14-year-old. He played 16 league matches for Eidskog before joining the Glåmdal region's biggest side Kongsvinger ahead of the 2013 season. He made his debut in the Norwegian First Division on 5 May 2013 as a substitute against Fredrikstad, aged 15 years and 275 days. He is the youngest player to have ever played for Kongsvinger's first team in a competitive match.

Lillebekk Ovlien played regularly for Kongsvinger over the next five years, playing a total of 114 competitive matches for the first team, scoring five goals. This includes 62 matches (two goals) in the Norwegian First Division. He also played all seven matches when Kongsvinger, as a club first, reached the final of the Norwegian Cup in 2016. He started in the final against Rosenborg, where Kongsvinger lost by a score of 4–0.

Despite interest from clubs in Eliteserien, Lillebekk Ovlien decided to sign a new contract with Kongsvinger in the autumn of 2017, stating: "KIL is a safe place for me, and I feel this is the place where I can develop the most. I am allowed to try and fail at this club. It would also be nice if KIL got a transfer fee for us the day we join another club," after he and his teammate Harald Holter had extended their contracts.

International career

Lillebekk Ovlien debuted on the international level when he was selected for Norway's Under-15 team in a match against Sweden on 18 September 2012. Lillebekk Ovlien appeared in 50 international games on youth level. His final international was an Under-19 match against Portugal on 15 February 2016.

Death
Lillebekk Ovlien died suddenly on the morning of 16 March 2018, aged 20. He had played in a pre-season friendly against Chinese side Sichuan Longfor four days earlier in La Manga, Spain. According to a press release from the club, he died as a result of an acute infection which likely caused septic shock. Sports director Espen Nystuen said "This is the saddest day in KIL's history." A tribute to Lillebekk Ovlien was held at the international friendly between Norway and Australia on 23 March.

Career statistics

References

External links

1997 births
2018 deaths
Norwegian footballers
Norway youth international footballers
Kongsvinger IL Toppfotball players
Norwegian First Division players
Association football defenders
People from Eidskog
Deaths from sepsis
Sportspeople from Innlandet